The Diana Award honours young people who work to improve the lives of others. Named after Diana, Princess of Wales, the award was established in 1999 by a board chaired by Gordon Brown. 

The award was launched by former UK Prime Minister Gordon Brown in honour of the late Diana, Princess of Wales. Current patrons of the Diana Award include former Prime Minister David Cameron, Dame Julia Samuel, former Scottish First Minister Jack McConnell and Esther Rantzen CBE. 

The organisation is a charity legacy to Diana, Princess of Wales' belief that young people have the power to change the world. The purpose of the Diana Award is to appreciate and celebrate the work which young people make to society – those who are young ambassadors, young leaders, young humanitarians, fundraisers, environmental campaigners, peer mentors, sports leaders and those who inspire others. The vision is to empower young people to change the world, promoting a culture that celebrates young people from all sections of society who have made a selfless contribution to society. 

The Prince of Wales and Prince Harry, Duke of Sussex, regularly attend events of the Diana Award in honour of their mother Diana, Princess of Wales, after whom the award is named.

Award winners include Kanchan Amatya, Georgina Lara Booth, Asafa Powell,  Angelo Cardona and Aishwarya Sridhar.

References

External links 
 

Memorial funds
Awards by age of recipient
Awards established in 1999
Humanitarian and service awards
Memorials to Diana, Princess of Wales
1999 establishments in the United Kingdom